Stephen Oremus (born 1971) is an American musician who has worked on Broadway theatre productions as musical director and as orchestrator. His credits include arranger and orchestrator for the music for Avenue Q, musical director and arranger for Wicked, arranger and orchestrator for All Shook Up, and musical director for 9 to 5. His orchestrations (with Larry Hochman) for The Book of Mormon won him a Tony Award in 2011, for Best Orchestrations. Oremus also won the Tony Award for Best Orchestrations for Kinky Boots.

Oremus served as orchestra conductor and music director for Frozen 2
Rufus Wainwright's 2006 Judy Garland tribute concert, which was released as the 2007 album Rufus Does Judy at Carnegie Hall and DVD Rufus! Rufus! Rufus! Does Judy! Judy! Judy!: Live from the London Palladium. 

Oremus was born and raised in Livingston, New Jersey, and attended Livingston High School. He graduated from the Berklee College of Music in Boston in 1992, with a major in film scoring.

He is the arranger and producer of the bare bones sophisticated version of "New York, New York" sung by Carey Mulligan in the feature film Shame.

Personal life
Oremus is married to actor, singer, and dancer Justin Bohon.

Broadway credits
2018 - Frozen - Conductor, Music Supervisor, Arrangements

2012 - Kinky Boots - Arrangements, Orchestrations, Vocal Supervision

2011 - The Book of Mormon - Co-Orchestrator, Vocal Arrangements, Music Director, Conductor, Keyboards

2008 - 9 to 5 - Keyboard 1, Conductor, Musical Director, Additional Orchestrations, Incidental Music Arrangements

2008 - The Yellow Brick Road Not Taken - Musical Supervisor

2006 - High Fidelity - Vocal Arrangements

2005 - All Shook Up - Musical Supervisor, Arrangements, Orchestration

2003 - Wicked - Musical Supervisor, Conductor, Music Director, Music Arrangements

2003 - Avenue Q - Music Orchestrations, Musical Supervisor, Music Arrangements

References

External links
 

American music arrangers
Livingston High School (New Jersey) alumni
People from Livingston, New Jersey
Berklee College of Music alumni
American LGBT musicians
LGBT people from New Jersey
1971 births
Living people
Grammy Award winners
Tony Award winners
Date of birth missing (living people)